Rob Burton is a Canadian businessman, journalist and politician. He currently serves as the mayor of Oakville, Ontario, in Canada. He was elected in the municipal elections of 2006, having failed to unseat Ann Mulvale in 2003. He was re-elected to office in the 2010, 2014 and 2018 municipal elections.

In a 2014 endorsement of his re-election campaign, the Toronto Star editorial board called Burton "among the best mayors in the Greater Toronto Area."

Early career and education

Burton graduated from the University of New Mexico with a degree in history and economics before receiving a Master's of Science in Journalism from Columbia University.

After receiving his master's degree in 1971, he became a journalist for the Watertown Daily Times in New York State. He was recruited shortly after by CBC to help establish their new consumer rights programme Marketplace. He worked as a journalist and television producer until 1988, when he led the creation of the youth-focused television station YTV. After founding the station, he went on to work as the general manager and vice-president of programming and production.

Political career

Burton first ran for mayor in 2003. A dark-horse candidate up against five-term incumbent Ann Mulvale, Burton ultimately lost his first bid for Mayor by a grand total of 28 votes. Burton ran again in 2006, managing to unseat Mulvale by a nearly 2000-vote margin. Mulvale challenged Burton for the mayorship once again in 2010, but was soundly defeated by over 4000 votes.

In his time as Mayor, Burton has been an outspoken advocate for growth control, environmental protection and greenspace. He is a vocal supporter of Ontario's Greenbelt, founding the "Municipal Leaders for the Greenbelt" alongside Ajax Mayor Steve Parrish and Toronto Councillor Glenn de Baeremaker, which he still chairs today.  He is a vocal critic of Ontario's development industry, describing large developers as a 'cartel' in 2017, after suggestions that developers wanted to ease planning restrictions and greenspace protections to improve housing affordability.

In 2015, Burton apologized for a series of tweets comparing Stephen Harper's use of veterans in the Canadian Corps of Commissionaires to Mussolini's Blackshirts and Hitler's Brownshirts.

Burton is the founder and chair of the Ontario Auto Mayors, a group of municipal leaders in communities with a large automotive manufacturing presence, advocating for more coordinated support of Ontario's automotive sector among all three levels of government. He has also served as the Chair of the Halton Police Services Board since 2014.

Rob Burton won reelection in October 2022 by a narrow margin.

See also
List of mayors of Oakville, Ontario

References

External links

 Rob Burton official website
 Town of Oakville Official Mayor's Page

Living people
Mayors of Oakville, Ontario
Columbia University Graduate School of Journalism alumni
Year of birth missing (living people)